The Latin alphabet or Roman alphabet is the collection of letters originally used by the ancient Romans to write the Latin language. Largely unaltered with the exception of extensions (such as diacritics), it forms the Latin script that is used to write English and other modern European languages. With modifications, it is also used for other alphabets, such as the Vietnamese alphabet. Its modern repertoire is standardised as the ISO basic Latin alphabet.

Etymology
The term Latin alphabet may refer to either the alphabet used to write Latin (as described in this article) or other alphabets based on the Latin script, which is the basic set of letters common to the various alphabets descended from the classical Latin alphabet, such as the English alphabet. These Latin-script alphabets may discard letters, like the Rotokas alphabet, or add new letters, like the Danish and Norwegian alphabets. Letter shapes have evolved over the centuries, including the development in Medieval Latin of lower-case, forms which did not exist in the Classical period alphabet.

Evolution 
The Latin alphabet evolved from the visually similar Etruscan alphabet, which evolved from the Cumaean Greek version of the Greek alphabet, which was itself descended from the Phoenician alphabet, which in turn derived from Egyptian hieroglyphs. The Etruscans ruled early Rome; their alphabet evolved in Rome over successive centuries to produce the Latin alphabet.
During the Middle Ages, the Latin alphabet was used (sometimes with modifications) for writing Romance languages, which are direct descendants of Latin, as well as Celtic, Germanic, Baltic and some Slavic languages. With the age of colonialism and Christian evangelism, the Latin script spread beyond Europe, coming into use for writing indigenous American, Australian, Austronesian, Austroasiatic and African languages. More recently, linguists have also tended to prefer the Latin script or the International Phonetic Alphabet (itself largely based on the Latin script) when transcribing or creating written standards for non-European languages, such as the African reference alphabet.

Signs and abbreviations
Although Latin did not use diacritical marks, signs of truncation of words (often placed above or at the end of the truncated word) were very common. Furthermore, abbreviations or smaller overlapping letters were often used. This was due to the fact that if the text was engraved on the stone, the number of letters to be written was reduced, while if it was written on paper or parchment, it saved precious space. This habit continued even in the Middle Ages. Hundreds of symbols and abbreviations exist, varying from century to century.

History

Origins

It is generally believed that the Latin alphabet used by the Romans was derived from the Old Italic alphabet used by the Etruscans.
That alphabet was derived from the Euboean alphabet used by the Cumae, which in turn was derived from the Phoenician alphabet.

Old Italic alphabet

Archaic Latin alphabet

Old Latin alphabet
Latin included 21 different characters. The letter  was the western form of the Greek gamma, but it was used for the sounds  and  alike, possibly under the influence of Etruscan, which might have lacked any voiced plosives. Later, probably during the 3rd century BC, the letter  – unneeded to write Latin properly – was replaced with the new letter , a  modified with a small vertical stroke, which took its place in the alphabet. From then on,  represented the voiced plosive , while  was generally reserved for the voiceless plosive .

Classical Latin alphabet
An attempt by the emperor Claudius to introduce three additional letters did not last. Thus it was during the classical Latin period that the Latin alphabet contained 23 letters:

This scheme has continued to be used by most modern European languages that have adopted the Latin alphabet. For the Latin sounds represented by the various letters see Latin spelling and pronunciation; for the names of the letters in English see English alphabet.

Diacritics were not regularly used, but they did occur sometimes, the most common being the apex used to mark long vowels, which had previously sometimes been written doubled. However, in place of taking an apex, the letter i was written taller: . For example, what is today transcribed  was written  in the inscription depicted.
Some letters have more than one form in epigraphy.

The primary mark of punctuation was the interpunct, which was used as a word divider, though it fell out of use after 200 AD.

Old Roman cursive script, also called majuscule cursive and capitalis cursive, was the everyday form of handwriting used for writing letters, by merchants writing business accounts, by schoolchildren learning the Latin alphabet, and even emperors issuing commands. A more formal style of writing was based on Roman square capitals, but cursive was used for quicker, informal writing. It was most commonly used from about the 1st century BC to the 3rd century, but it probably existed earlier than that. It led to Uncial, a majuscule script commonly used from the 3rd to 8th centuries AD by Latin and Greek scribes.
Tironian notes were a shorthand system consisting of thousands of signs.

This script evolved into a variety of regional medieval scripts (for example, the Merovingian, Visigothic and Benevantan scripts), to be later supplanted by the Carolingian minuscule.

Medieval and later developments

Prior to that, the former had been merely allographs of the latter.

With the fragmentation of political power, the style of writing changed and varied greatly throughout the Middle Ages, even after the invention of the printing press. Early deviations from the classical forms were the uncial script, a development of the Old Roman cursive, and various so-called minuscule scripts that developed from New Roman cursive, of which the insular script developed by Irish literati and derivations of this, such as Carolingian minuscule were the most influential, introducing the lower case forms of the letters, as well as other writing conventions that have since become standard.

The languages that use the Latin script generally use capital letters to begin paragraphs and sentences and proper nouns. The rules for capitalization have changed over time, and different languages have varied in their rules for capitalization. Old English, for example, was rarely written with even proper nouns capitalized, whereas Modern English writers and printers of the 17th and 18th century frequently capitalized most and sometimes all nouns, which is still systematically done in Modern German, e.g. in the preamble and all of the United States Constitution: We the People of the United States, in Order to form a more perfect Union, establish Justice, insure domestic Tranquility, provide for the common defence, promote the general Welfare, and secure the Blessings of Liberty to ourselves and our Posterity, do ordain and establish this Constitution for the United States of America.

See also
Latin spelling and pronunciation
Calligraphy
Euboean alphabet
Latin script in Unicode
ISO basic Latin alphabet
Latin-1
Legacy of the Roman Empire
Palaeography
Phoenician alphabet
Pinyin
Roman letters used in mathematics
Typography
Western Latin character sets (computing)

References

Further reading 

: Peter Lang.

External links 

Lewis and Short Latin Dictionary on the letter G
Latin-Alphabet

 
Typography
History of the Roman Empire